John But or Butte (fl. 1402–1425), of St Gennys, Cornwall was an English politician.

He was a Member (MP) of the Parliament of England for Barnstaple in 1402, for Bodmin in May 1413 and November 1414, for Liskeard in 1417 and for Truro 1422 and 1425.

References

14th-century births
15th-century deaths
English MPs 1402
English MPs May 1413
English MPs November 1414
English MPs 1417
English MPs 1422
English MPs 1425
Members of the Parliament of England (pre-1707) for Barnstaple
Members of the Parliament of England for Bodmin
Members of the Parliament of England (pre-1707) for Liskeard
Members of the Parliament of England for Truro
Medieval Cornish people